Roadside rambler may refer to:

 Roadside rambler (Amblyscirtes celia), a butterfly of the family Hesperiidae and subfamily Hesperiinae
 Roadside rambler (Pholisora catullus), a butterfly of the family Hesperiidae and subfamily Pyrginae

Animal common name disambiguation pages